Bom Jesus may refer to:

Angola

Bom Jesus, Icolo e Bengo, a commune in Icolo e Bengo, Luanda, Angola

Brazil

 Bom Jesus, a district in Pirenópolis
 Bom Jesus, Paraíba, a city in Paraíba
 Bom Jesus, Piauí, a city in Piauí
 Bom Jesus, Rio Grande do Norte, a city in Rio Grande do Norte
 Bom Jesus, Rio Grande do Sul, a city in Rio Grande do Sul
 Bom Jesus, Santa Catarina, a city in Santa Catarina
 Bom Jesus, Porto Alegre, a region of the city of Porto Alegre
 Bom Jesus, a beach in Arroio do Sal, Rio Grande do Sul

Also:
 Bom Jesus do Amparo, a city in Minas Gerais
 Bom Jesus do Galho, a city in Minas Gerais
 Bom Jesus de Goiás, a city in Goiás
 Bom Jesus do Itabapoana, a city in Rio of Janeiro
 Bom Jesus da Lapa, a city in Bahia
 Bom Jesus do Norte, a city in Espírito Santo
 Bom Jesus do Oeste, a city in Santa Catarina
 Bom Jesus da Penha, a city in Minas Gerais
 Bom Jesus dos Perdões, a city in São Paulo
 Bom Jesus das Selvas, a city in Maranhão
 Bom Jesus da Serra, a city in Bahia
 Bom Jesus do Sul, a city in Paraná
 Bom Jesus do Tocantins, Pará, a city in Pará
 Bom Jesus do Tocantins, Tocantins, a city in Tocantins
 Córrego do Bom Jesus, a city in Minas Gerais
 Pirapora do Bom Jesus, a city in São Paulo
 Ponte Alta do Bom Jesus, a city in Tocantins

India
 Basilica of Bom Jesus, a minor basilica in Goa

Namibia
 Bom Jesus, a Portuguese nau that set sail from Lisbon in 1533

Portugal

 Bom Jesus do Monte, a sanctuary in Braga, Portugal